Dirk Janssen (11 July 1881 – 22 November 1986) was a Dutch gymnast who competed in the 1908 Summer Olympics.

Born in Groningen, Janssen was part of the Dutch gymnastics team, which finished seventh in the team event. In the individual all-around competition he finished 69th.

He was the younger brother of Jan Janssen. He died at the age of 105 in Haarlem.

References

External links
 

1881 births
1986 deaths
Dutch male artistic gymnasts
Dutch centenarians
Gymnasts at the 1908 Summer Olympics
Olympic gymnasts of the Netherlands
Sportspeople from Groningen (city)
Men centenarians